is a Japanese anime television series animated by J.C.Staff and broadcast on TV Kanagawa from January to July 2004. The anime was originally licensed by Geneon USA. It is now licensed by Sentai Filmworks.

A manga adaptation, illustrated by manga artist Satoshi Shiki titled , was serialized in Young King OURs magazine and serves as a prequel to the television series.

Story
In the future, water has covered much of the Earth due to the effects of global warming, leaving the human race to live on neighboring floating cities. The orphaned Maia Mizuki, fifteen years of age, just graduated from middle school and has already applied for employment in the elite Ocean Agency, part of the futuristic world government. Only the best, most intelligent, and physically fit students are eligible for admission. Maia, the series' protagonist, is set to become one of the few.

But her ideal life quickly falls apart. To her disappointment, Maia unexpectedly fails her entrance exams despite her high grades. Making matters worse, she promptly gets evicted from her house, pick pocketed, taken hostage, then shot. She is "saved" by two females (Rena and Shizuka) that are part of an unorthodox help-for-hire organization called Nereids (inspired by the Greek mythological Nereids). With nowhere to go, Maia joins up with Nereids, taking jobs from capturing wanted criminals to chasing stray cats, often with unexpected results. Gloria and Yu later join up with Nereids.

"Daphne", Greek for "Laurel tree", in the title refers to the last words said by Maia's grandfather. "Brilliant Blue" refers to the fact that this is a world covered by water with almost no land. The world consists of vast oceans, a few islands, and floating cities. This subplot that starts midway into the series concerns Maia's journey to retrieve a time capsule of her past buried under a laurel tree in Elpida, an undersea city lost over a century ago.

In almost every episode, there is a recitation of a verse that Maia's grandfather taught her.  She and others say it whenever her life is difficult or in danger - "A tree that is planted by water will produce fruit in due season, its leaves will never whither...".  It is never identified as Psalm 1:3, "He is like a tree planted by streams of water, which yields its fruit in season and whose leaf does not wither.  Whatever he does prospers." (NIV)

The manga of the series is a prequel  that takes place a century ago when humans were forced to live undersea when the cities were Greek named. Elpida means "hope." Now they're Russian inspired, like Kamchatka. Ai Mayuzumi, Millie's great grandmother is the protagonist of the story.

Characters
 
 
 Maia is the protagonist of the series. She has lost all of her childhood memories, because as a child, Maia was put into a one year coma because of a car wreck. The cause of it was because while in the car with her parents, the controls malfunctioned. Her parents died. Waking up, she was introduced to a man claiming to be her grandfather. In episode 11, Maia tells the girls of Nereids her story of waking up from her coma. During the flashback, Maia asks her grandpa why whenever he smiles at her, he seems sad. At the end of the episode, she is looking at a picture of her grandfather then she asks, "What is it that you were keeping hidden from me, Grandpa." Although Maia is an excellent student she is rejected by the Ocean Agency, an elite paramilitary organization that is part of the futuristic world government. So instead Maia, broke and homeless, joins  Nereids, an unorthodox help-for-hire organization inspired by the Greek mythological Nereids. She is optimistic, hard working, and honest, yet a naive and shy cute girl-next-door. Maia is in search of her past and continues to do so while working with Nereids.
 
 
 Leader of the Nereids Kamchatka branch. Rena is capable, elegant, and cunning, although she can be cold at times. Although not the branch manager in title, she is the de facto leader and makes the decisions. She is cool and calculating and her sharp instincts enable her to know the weaknesses of other people. Rena has no moral qualms about seducing others for manipulation or for a weapon use. She is also frugal with money and deducts pay from salaries under even the slightest pretext.
 
 
 Busty and bespectacled with purple hair, Shizuka is a brilliant mechanic who grew up in an inner city district of Shibuya and knows many people there. She is known for her poor shooting aim and is friendly, casual, and trusting with a voracious appetite for food.
 
 
 Loud, spontaneous, tomboyish, and somewhat reckless with a ganguro style complexion, Gloria is a trigger-happy champion marksman and the weapons specialist with a grudge against Rena for deserting her on a past mission. She tends to stick to her guns and loves to shoot things up and she does not get along with Yū. Gloria loves money and bothers Rena about how much she owes her. She is the only character without a regular civilian outfit.
 
 
 Silent, brooding, nihilistic, and a loner, Yu is a ridiculously strong fighter and hand-to-hand combat specialist. She had her license revoked in the past for destroying private property and injuring several police officers (including Detective Yagi) and bystanders. She has a loyalty to Rena, but does not get along too well with Gloria, where comically they are usually paired up on assignments, and constantly hits her. Yu's interests include animals and travel.
 
 
 Maia's best friend from her Ocean Agency days who got accepted, despite having average grades. She and Maia had made a promise to work with each other.
 
 
 The inept branch manager of the Nereids Kamchatka branch. He gets pushed around by his female co-workers. Hanaoka has a wife and a daughter Yukari.
 
 
 Tsutomu Hanaoka's daughter. She gets displeased with her father's ineptness at times, especially when he lied about being a dashing, bold, detective, but still loves him dearly.
 
 
 The chief inspector of the Kamchatka city police force, he gets stressed when it comes to Nereids. One of his biggest burdens is Yu who injured him in the past.
 
 
 Shizuka's friend (and later Maia's) who is a skilled race car driver. She is inspired by her great-grandmother Ai Mayuzumi (the protagonist of the manga version which is a prequel to this story). Ai was Maia's father's bodyguard.
 
 
 Son of their mother's fourth husband.
 
 
 Son of their mother's seventh husband.
 
 
 Son of their mother's second husband and the oldest of the Wong-Chang-Lee brothers.
 
 
 Sister of the Wong-Chang-Lee brothers (the daughter of their mother's 14th husband). She is more level-headed and comptetent than they are. She is a martial artist and also wants to find the treasure of Elpida, to which end she stole a submarine (which gets repeatedly confiscated by the Nereids and subsequently stolen again by the family). The submarine was named Agnes for their mother. Shizuka renamed it Yomogi-1.
 
 
 A mysterious man in sunglasses who can be seen following Maia throughout the series. In episode 22, as he reveals himself to be a member of the Ocean Agencies Security division, charged with protecting her as seen in a few episodes.
 
 Shou Mizuki (old) .
 Shou Mizuki (young) 
 Maia's Grandfather who raised her after she awoken from her coma five years ago. He tried to help her regain the memories she lost in the supposedly recent accident that claimed her parents. Shown only in flashbacks, he died right before the first episode. His last word to her, "daphne", refers to a laurel tree in their former home. When Maia uncovered the buried time capsule where the tree once stood in Elpida, Grandpa was revealed to be her big brother. The siblings were placed in hibernation pods over a century ago when their parents and undersea city were quarantined by the Ocean Agency. His pod was found and he was awakened 60 years prior her and he was forced into the government coverup of their prior life. Maia did not age during her slumber.
 
 
 Maia's father.
 
 
 Maia's mother.

Media

Manga
The manga version  was drawn by manga artist and character designer Satoshi Shiki titled, featured in Young King OURs magazine. The manga story is a prequel to the television series. Shonengahosha published the first volume in 2004. Kodansha published both volumes together in 2008. Tokyopop licensed the manga series for distribution in North America and published an English language 208-page graphic novel "Daphne in the Brilliant Blue" in 2006.

Anime
The  24-episode anime television series was animated by the studio J.C.Staff and produced by GENCO and broadcast in on TV Kanagawa Japan in 2004. Two additional OVA episodes were also produced but not included with the original Japanese broadcast.

Episode list

Original video animation

Reception
Several of the individual DVD releases as well as the collections have received generally positive reviews. Carl Kimlinger reviewed Collection 1 awarding grades from "C" (story) to "B" (art & music) giving a "+: for its good sense of humor and a sympathetic lead and "−" for "not-so-good everything else", noting that "a high fan-service tolerance is necessary". Theron Martin reviewed Collection 2 awarding grades from "C" (animation) to "B" (art & music) giving a "+ as it "can be quite entertaining" and "−" for "stale ideas and distractingly outrageous costume designs".

References

External links
  
 

2004 anime television series debuts
2004 manga
2004 Japanese television series debuts
2004 Japanese television series endings
Action anime and manga
Anime with original screenplays
Geneon USA
Girls with guns anime and manga
J.C.Staff
Lantis (company)
Madman Entertainment anime
Science fiction anime and manga
Seinen manga
Sentai Filmworks
Shōnen Gahōsha manga
Tokyopop titles
Zainichi Korean culture